Amlu, also spelled as amlou, is a spread of Moroccan cuisine. It consists of argan oil, almonds and honey. The almonds are toasted, which are then crushed and kneaded with honey and argan oil. Amlou is usually served for breakfast or afternoon tea with pancakes and pastries.

Amlu is one of the multiple uses of Argan oil. In Shilha cuisine, argan oil plays the role usually held by olive oil in other parts of the Maghreb.

See also
 Cooking oil
 List of spreads
 Chocolate spread

References

External links 

 How to make Amlou
 

Spreads (food)
Moroccan cuisine
Berber culture